The Sanctuary (church-mosque) in Shkodër, Albania is a Cultural Monument of Albania.

References

Cultural Monuments of Albania
Buildings and structures in Shkodër